Shang Juncheng (also known as Jerry Shang; born 2 February 2005) is a Chinese tennis player. Shang reached his career-high singles ranking of world No. 167 on 30 January 2023. In July 2021, he reached the number one in the ITF junior rankings.

Personal life
Shang currently trains and lives at the IMG Academy in Bradenton, Florida.

Shang is the son of former footballer Shang Yi and former table tennis player Wu Na.

Junior career

2019: First ITF title
In 2019, Shang was the first player born in 2005 to win a tournament on the ITF Junior Circuit.

2021: Major finalist
Shang played in the French Open and reached the quarterfinals, in which he lost to Sean Cuenin in two sets.
He also played in the Wimbledon Junior Division and reached the semifinals. He lost to Victor Lilov in two sets.
In the US Open Junior Division, he reached the final and lost to Daniel Rincón in two sets (2–6, 6–76).

Professional career

2022: ATP and historic Masters and top 200 debuts
Shang made his debut on the professional tour, after receiving a wildcard to play in the main draw of the ATP Tour 500 event at the 2022 Rio Open, after Juan Martín del Potro announced his retirement from professional tennis. Shang was defeated by Pedro Martínez in the first round.

He received a wildcard into the qualifying draw of Indian Wells, where he beat Francisco Cerúndolo in the first round and his opponent Mats Moraing retired in the second. Having qualified into the main draw, he became the first Chinese man to play at Indian Wells and the first player from his country to qualify for an ATP Masters 1000. He was defeated by Jaume Munar in straight sets.
He won his first title at the 2022 Lexington Challenger becoming the youngest Chinese player to win a trophy in the Challenger Tour history and the youngest since Carlos Alcaraz at Alicante in 2020.
He reached the top 200 at world No. 195 on 19 September 2022.

2023: Historic Grand Slam debut and first win
Shang made his Grand Slam debut by qualifying at the Australian Open, after defeating Fábián Marozsán, 16th seed Fernando Verdasco and Zsombor Piros, becoming the youngest male player at the tournament and the youngest Grand Slam men’s qualifier since 17-year-old Carlos Alcaraz at the 2021 Australian Open. He became the 10th Chinese mainland player to reach the main draw at this Major in 2023. It was the first time a male Chinese trio was set to compete in a major singles draw in the Open era (since 1968) and the first in all of Australian Open history (since 1905). Shang defeated Oscar Otte in the first round, becoming the first Chinese male player to win a match at the Australian Open in the Open Era. He then lost in straight sets to Frances Tiafoe in the second round.

ITF World Tennis Tour and ATP Challenger finals

Singles: 7 (6 titles, 1 runner-up)

Performance Timeline

Singles

Junior Grand Slam finals

Singles: 1 (1 runner-up)

References

External links
 
 

2005 births
Living people
Chinese male tennis players
Sportspeople from Bradenton, Florida